Reality Check was an Alternative Rock band, that formed in the mid-1990s, with the support of Michael Tait, of DC Talk. Originally consisting of three members, Chris Blaney, Nathan Barlowe, and Rod Shuler, the band grew to eight members, before disbanding in 1998. Two members of Reality Check, Nathan Barlowe and Jonny MacIntosh, went on to help form Luna Halo.

Musical career
After releasing an independent album, called Soulfood, Reality Check signed a deal with Star Song Communications, and released a self-titled album, on June 3, 1997. The next year, Reality Check disbanded for unknown reasons.

Music
Reality Check's sound could be described as a mix of PFR, and DC Talk.

Soulfood
Soulfood was the group's first album, released under the name Reality Check. Soulfood relied heavily on samples for the backing tracks, including beats from artists, such as the Beastie Boys, and House of Pain. This album featured a different sound than their later work, such as their self-titled album, and could best be defined as late 1980s hip-hop.
Tracks
 Positivity
 Temptation
 One Reason
 I Can't See
 Devil's In My Hair
 Praise On
 Step 2 Da Mic
 Friends
 Soulfood
 The Blood
 Role Models
 Bring It To The Cross

Self-titled Album (Reality Check)
This album contains two tracks, featuring Michael Tait. In the song "Apart From You", Tait can be heard singing the words, "apart from you", in the background, during the bridge. There is also a hidden prank call at 5:19, on the last track on the CD, where Tait, and friend, Jason Halbert, are called simultaneously in a prank three-way call. This track is not available on the cassette version.
Tracks
 The Way I Am
 Plastic
 Masquerade
 Carousel
 Know You Better
 Midnight Confessions
 Apart From You
 Time is Fading
 Speak To Me
 Losing Myself

Members
 Nathan Barlowe - lead vocals, guitar
 Chris Blaney - vocals
 Josh Sampson - lead guitar
 Dave Muckel - horns, vocals
 Rod Shuler - vocals
 Steve Dale - bass guitar
 Yinka Jolaoso - percussion
 Jonathan MacIntosh - electric guitar
 Jody Waldrop - drums

Music videos
 Masquerade

Awards
 Academy of Gospel Music Arts' Spotlight `96 Best Artist
 2 New Talent Showcase Awards at Atlantafest

References

Musical groups established in 1996
American Christian rock groups